New National Party may refer to:
 New National Party (Grenada)
 New National Party (Netherlands)
 New National Party (New Zealand)
 New National Party (South Africa)
 New National Party, a proposed name for the National Democratic Party (Egypt)

See also
 National Party (disambiguation)